William A. Wright (April 4, 1936 – February 19, 2021) was an American golfer. He was the first African-American to win a USGA event, winning the 1959 U.S. Amateur Public Links Championship.

Wright was born in Kansas City, Missouri and later lived in Portland, Oregon and Seattle, Washington. He played college golf at Western Washington College of Education, winning the 1960 NAIA Men's Golf Championship individual title.

Wright turned professional in the early 1960s and played a few PGA Tour events. He played in the 1966 U.S. Open and five U.S. Senior Opens.

References

External links

American male golfers
African-American golfers
Golfers from Missouri
Golfers from Los Angeles
Golfers from Seattle
Western Washington University alumni
Sportspeople from Kansas City, Missouri
1936 births
2021 deaths
20th-century African-American sportspeople
21st-century African-American people